El Sol is a Spanish phrase meaning "the sun". It may refer to:

Newspapers
 El Sol (Santa Cruz), a Bolivian newspaper
 El Sol (Quito), an Ecuadoran newspaper; see Alejandro Carrión
 El Sol (Monterrey), a Mexican newspaper; owned by Grupo Reforma
 El Sol de Mexico, a Mexican newspaper owned by Organización Editorial Mexicana
 El Sol, a Peruvian newspaper; see Isabel Sabogal
 El Sol (Madrid), a defunct Spanish newspaper
 El Sol de Maturín, a Venezuelan newspaper
 El Sol (Stamford), an American newspaper
 El Sol de Salinas, an American weekly newspaper

Other uses
 El Sol (bus line), Los Angeles, California, United States
 El Sol (festival), held annually in San Sebastián, Spain
 El Sol metro station, Valparaíso, Chile
 El Sol del Peru, an award bestowed by the nation of Peru
 , a cargo ship built in 1910

Lists of newspapers